Diego Melián de León (born 4 November 1991) is a Uruguayan footballer of Armenian descent who plays as a goalkeeper for Deportivo Municipal in the Peruvian Primera División.

References

External links

1991 births
Living people
Uruguayan footballers
Uruguayan expatriate footballers
Danubio F.C. players
Huracán F.C. players
Racing Club de Montevideo players
Deportivo Municipal footballers
Uruguayan Primera División players
Uruguayan Segunda División players
Peruvian Primera División players
Uruguayan expatriate sportspeople in Peru
Expatriate footballers in Peru
Association football goalkeepers